Hydel may refer to:
 Shorthand for hydroelectricity, by combining the prefix hyd- (from "hydro-") with -el (from "electricity")
 Mirosław Hydel (born 1963), Polish long jumper